John Laughton may refer to:

John George Laughton (1891–1965), New Zealand missionary
John Knox Laughton (1830–1915), English naval historian